National Sports Stadium can refer to:

National Sports Stadium (Mongolia)
National Sports Stadium (Zimbabwe)

See also
National sport
National Sports Center, United States
National Sports Centre (disambiguation)
National Sports Complex, Malaysia
Olimpiyskiy National Sports Complex, Ukraine
List of national stadiums